Philippe Boyard (31 October 1916 – 16 April 1969) was a French ice hockey player. He competed in the men's tournament at the 1936 Winter Olympics. Boyard died in Paris on 16 April 1969, at the age of 52.

References

External links
 

1916 births
1969 deaths
Ice hockey players at the 1936 Winter Olympics
Olympic ice hockey players of France